Vladimir Kononov may refer to:

 Vladimir Kononov (politician) (born 1958), Russian politician
 Vladimir Kononov (skier) (born 1972), Russian cross-country skier and Paralympian
 Vladimir Kononov (Donetsk People's Republic) (born 1974), ex-defence minister of the self-proclaimed Donetsk People's Republic